Gregory Paul Soriano also known as Greggy Soriano, is a YouTuber, content creator, chef, and cake designer.  He is the star of the reality television show, Cakezilla on TLC (Asia), which premiered on July 25, 2018. He is known for being in the first season of Cake Boss: Next Great Baker on TLC. He was cast as "Greggy, The Self Proclaimed Gaysian" on Beauty and the Geek Season 5 on The CW Television Network.

Early and personal life
Soriano, a Filipino American, was born in Glendora, California. He spent his childhood in Azusa, California. He was a member of the performing group The Young Americans, He attended Hyde Park, New York campus of the Culinary Institute of America.  He currently lives in Jersey City, NJ.

References

American male chefs
American people of Filipino descent
American television chefs
Year of birth missing (living people)
Living people
American bakers
Pastry chefs
Culinary Institute of America Hyde Park alumni
The Young Americans members